Granopupa granum is a species of air-breathing land snails in the family Chondrinidae.

The species is found in Western Europe and Mediterranean.

References
 

Chondrinidae